David Hirst (born 1936) is a Middle East correspondent based in Beirut.

He attended Rugby School from 1949 to 1954 and performed his national service in Egypt and Cyprus from 1954 to 1956. From 1956 to 1963, he studied at Oxford University and the American University of Beirut. He reported for The Guardian from 1963 to 1997 and has also written for The Christian Science Monitor, The Irish Times, the St. Petersburg Times in Florida, Newsday, the San Francisco Chronicle and the Daily Star in Lebanon. He was kidnapped twice (including one kidnapping in Beirut from which he escaped by bolting from his captors' car in a Shia neighbourhood of Beirut) and was banned at various times from visiting six Arab countries, including Egypt, Syria, Saudi Arabia and Iraq. He continued to contribute to The Guardian until 2013.

Books
Oil and Public Opinion in the Middle East (1966) 
Sadat with Irene Beeson (1981) 
The Gun and the Olive Branch (First Published 1977; Second Edition 1984; Edition with New Foreword 2003) 
Beware of Small States: Lebanon, Battleground of the Middle East (2010) 
حذار من الدول الصغيرة: لبنان، ساحةُ معارك الشرق الأوسط - Arabic Edition of Beware of Small States: Lebanon, Battleground of the Middle East (Rimal Publications, 2013)

References

External links
 Profile and Columns at The Guardian
Brief biography and articles from The Nation
Excerpt from The Gun and the Olive Branch
Interview with David Hirst about "Beware of Small States" in www.theglobaldispatches.com
Arabic Edition of "Beware of Small States"

1936 births
Living people
British male journalists
People educated at Rugby School
The Guardian people
The Christian Science Monitor people
The Irish Times people
Newsday people
San Francisco Chronicle people